A three-decker is a wooden ship having three decks, especially one of a class of sail-powered warships with guns on three decks.

Three-decker may also refer to:

Architecture
 Three-decker (house), a dwelling with an apartment on each floor
 A pulpit on three levels, with different usages during a church service for each level, often found in 18th-century churches in England and restorations dating to that time

Publishing
 Three-volume novel, three books by one author bound in one volume
 The Thorne Smith Three-Decker, by Thorne Smith

Buses
Triple decker bus

See also